Zimon or Zimoń is a surname. Notable people with the surname include:

 Anatoly Zimon (1924–2015), Russian professor
 Damian Zimoń (born 1934), Polish archbishop
  (born 1940), Polish philologist

See also
 
 Zima (surname)

Polish-language surnames